Ewen MacLachlan (Gaelic: Eòghann MacLachlainn) (1775–1822) was a Scottish scholar and poet. He is noted for his translations of ancient classical literature into Gaelic, for his own Gaelic verse, and for his contribution to Gaelic dictionaries.

MacLachlan is considered one of the most important figures in the preservation of Gaelic as a written language and written literature.

Life
MacLachlan was born in Lochaber, and educated at Aberdeen University. He was librarian to University and Kings College, Aberdeen from 1800–1818, and headmaster of Aberdeen grammar school from 1810–1822. He translated the first eight books of Homer's Iliad into Gaelic. He also composed and published his own Gaelic Attempts in Verse (1807) and Metrical Effusions (1816), and contributed greatly to the 1828 Gaelic–English Dictionary.

Ionad Eòghainn MhicLachlainn (The National Centre for Gaelic Translation) 
In 2021, Ionad Eòghainn MhicLachlainn (The National Centre for Gaelic Translation) was founded at the University of Aberdeen, to promote and enhance translation out of and into Gaelic, and was named in MacLachlan's honour.

See also

Scottish Gaelic literature
Scottish Gaelic

References
Anderson, Peter John. Ewen MacLachlan: Librarian to University and Kings College, Aberdeen, 1800-1818. Aberdeen: University Press, 1918.

Notes

External links

Ewen MacLachlan's works on GoogleBooks
Ewen MacLachlan in Celtic Culture: A Historical Encyclopedia
Ewen MacLachlan in The Poets and Poetry of Scotland
Ewen MacLachlan in Sar-obair nam Bard Gaelach, or The Beauties of Gaelic Poetry and Lives of the Highland Bards, edited by John Mackenzie
Ionad Eòghainn MhicLachlainn (The National Centre for Gaelic Translation)

1822 deaths
1775 births
19th-century British translators
19th-century Scottish Gaelic poets
19th-century Scottish writers
Academics of the University of Aberdeen
Alumni of the University of Aberdeen
Scottish classical scholars
Scottish lexicographers
Scottish scholars and academics
Scottish translators
Scottish book editors
Scottish Gaelic language
Translators of Homer
Translators to Scottish Gaelic